Longs Island is an island on the North Branch Potomac River nearly one mile long and contains the Long family farm, and is known for the corn it produces from the rich river silt laden soil. Longs Island lies in Allegany County Maryland, but is only accessible from Mineral County, West Virginia near Keyser. The island lies across the North Branch from McCoole, Maryland, but is in Maryland as the state boundary is the low water mark on the West Virginia side of the river.

Landforms of Allegany County, Maryland
River islands of Maryland
Islands of the Potomac River
Landforms of Mineral County, West Virginia